Magnolia Grove is a small neighborhood located along Buffalo Bayou between downtown Houston and Memorial Park in Houston, Texas. The neighborhood is bounded by Memorial Drive, Shepherd Drive, Washington Avenue, and Waugh Drive.

Education

Residents are zoned to Houston ISD schools. Residents are zoned to Memorial Elementary School, Hogg Middle School, and Reagan High School.

References

External links
 Magnolia Grove Civic Association

Neighborhoods in Houston